Jalan Ampang–Hulu Langat or Jalan Tasik Tambahan (Selangor state route B62) is a major road in Selangor, Malaysia. The road connects Taman Permai near Ampang in the west to Pekan Batu Empat Belas (Bt-14) Hulu Langat in the east. Its main features including a panoramic view of Kuala Lumpur from the top of Bukit Belacan hill.

Route background
The Kilometre Zero of the highway starts at Pekan Batu Empat Belas (Bt-14) town of Hulu Langat.

Notable events
15 November 2012 –  Jalan Ampang–Hulu Langat is closed to all vehicles following a landslide near the Kuala Lumpur Look Out Point Tourist Complex in Bukit Ampang/Bukit Belacan hill.
24 March 2014 – One person was killed and others injured in a school bus crash at Jalan Ampang–Hulu Langat near Ampang Look Out Point.

Features

Kuala Lumpur Look Out Point Tourist Complex
The Kuala Lumpur Look Out Point Tourist Complex, or Kompleks Pelancongan Menara Tinjau, is a popular attractions in Kuala Lumpur. It is located about 15 km from Kuala Lumpur city centre.

Facilities

Admissions

List of junctions

Roads in Selangor

References